The  was a major fatal railway accident which occurred on 25 February 1947 between  and  stations on the Hachikō Line in Japan. It was the worst railway accident to occur in Japan.

A Japanese Government Railways (JGR) passenger train hauled by a Class C57 steam locomotive travelling in the "down" direction derailed on a sharp curve, and four cars rolled over into a field. 184 passengers were killed and 495 were injured. It was later determined that the derailment had occurred due to a combination of excessive speed, and that the high casualty rate was due to the overcrowded wooden passenger cars, which were already worn out by overuse during the war.

JGR used the opportunity to obtain permission from the Supreme Commander of Allied Powers to replace all wooden passenger cars (approximately 3,000 were in use at the time) with steel-bodied cars within a few years.

References

Derailments in Japan
Railway accidents in 1947
1947 in Japan
February 1947 events in Asia

ja:日本の鉄道事故 (1949年以前)#八高線列車脱線転覆事故